Tiago da Rocha Vieira (4 June 1994 – 28 November 2016), known as Tiaguinho, was a Brazilian football player who last played for Chapecoense.

Tiaguinho was one of the victims when LaMia Airlines Flight 2933 crashed on 28 November 2016.

Personal life 
On December 12, 2015, Tiaguinho married his wife Graziele de Aquino Alves. A week before the accident, Tiaguinho found out he was to be a father. His teammates helped his wife deliver the message that she was pregnant and filmed the moment. His reaction was to yell with happiness, hug his teammates and make cradling motions as if he was holding a baby. According to his cousin Gilmara Marins, he always wanted to be a young father. On July 19, 2017, Tiaguinho's son was born. His wife named his child after him.

Club career
Born in Trajano de Morais, Rio de Janeiro, Tiaguinho finished his formation with XV de Piracicaba. He made his senior debut on 2 August 2014, coming on as a second half substitute in a 2–0 home win against Independente for the Copa Paulista championship.

Tiaguinho joined Metropolitano on 1 July 2015, ahead of the year's Série D. After the club's first-round knockout, he was loaned to Cianorte for three months.

Returning in January 2016, Tiaguinho impressed during the 2016 Campeonato Catarinense for Metrô, but still rescinded his contract – which was due to expire on 30 June – on 31 May. Nine days later, he was presented at Série A club Chapecoense.

Tiaguinho made his top tier debut on 11 June 2016, replacing Lucas Gomes in a 1–2 away loss against Ponte Preta. His first goals in the category came on 18 September, as he scored a double in a 2–2 home draw against the same opponent.

Tiaguinho subsequently became a regular starter at Chape, helping the side to reach the 2016 Copa Sudamericana Finals and scoring the club's last goal before the tragedy, in a 2–0 home win against São Paulo on 20 November.

Death
On 28 November 2016, whilst travelling with Chapecoense to the aforementioned finals, Tiaguinho was among the fatalities of the LaMia Flight 2933 accident in the Colombian village of Cerro Gordo, La Unión, Antioquia.

Career statistics

Honours
Chapecoense
 Copa Sudamericana: 2016 (posthumously)

References

External links

1994 births
2016 deaths
Sportspeople from Rio de Janeiro (state)
Brazilian footballers
Association football forwards
Campeonato Brasileiro Série A players
Campeonato Brasileiro Série D players
Esporte Clube XV de Novembro (Piracicaba) players
Clube Atlético Metropolitano players
Associação Chapecoense de Futebol players
Footballers killed in the LaMia Flight 2933 crash